Fuerzas Eléctricas del Noroeste, S.A. (Fenosa) (Northwest Electric Power) was a Spanish electric company based in A Coruña, Galicia.

History
Fenosa was founded in 1943 following the forced merger of Fábrica de Gas y Electricidad, owned by Pedro Barrié de la Maza, and Electra Popular Coruñesa, expropriated from José Miñones by the Francoist government.

In 1982, it was merged with Unión Eléctrica to create Union Fenosa, which would become one of the biggest power companies in Spain.

See also
 Count of Fenosa

References

External links
 Fuerzas Eléctricas del Noroeste, S.A. — Comisión Nacional del Mercado de Valores

Companies based in Galicia (Spain)
Energy companies established in 1943
Companies disestablished in 1982
Public utilities of Spain
1982 disestablishments in Spain
1943 establishments in Spain
Defunct electric power companies of Spain